The House at 8 Park Street, also known as the Dr. Joseph Poland House, is a historic house at 8 Park Street in Wakefield, Massachusetts.  The -story wood-frame house was built c. 1852 for Dr. Joseph Poland, who only briefly practiced in the town.  The house is in a vernacular Italianate style, with a two-story ell on the rear and a porch on the right side.  The house has elongated windows with entablatured surrounds.  The porch and front portico are supported by turned columns with bracketed tops, the building corners are pilastered, and there are paired brackets found in the eaves and gable ends.

The house was listed on the National Register of Historic Places in 1989.

See also
National Register of Historic Places listings in Wakefield, Massachusetts
National Register of Historic Places listings in Middlesex County, Massachusetts

References

Houses in Wakefield, Massachusetts
Houses on the National Register of Historic Places in Wakefield, Massachusetts
Italianate architecture in Massachusetts
Houses completed in 1852
1852 establishments in Massachusetts